Ackerson Creek is a stream in Tuolumne County, California, in the United States. It is a tributary of the South Fork Tuolumne River.

Ackerson Creek was named in honor of James F. Ackerson, a figure in the California Gold Rush.

Variant names
According to the Geographic Names Information System, it has also been known historically as:
Akerson Creek
Big Meadow Creek

Course
Ackerson Creek rises about 2 miles northeast of Bald Mountain, in Tuolumne County, California and then flows generally west-southwest to join South Fork Tuolumne River about 2.5 miles southwest of Ackerson Mountain.

Watershed
Ackerson Creek drains  of area, receives about 42.9 in/year of precipitation, has a wetness index of 364.64, and is about 82% forested.

References

Rivers of Tuolumne County, California
Rivers of Northern California